The Chelambra bank robbery in the Malappuram district of Kerala, India is considered to be one of the biggest and most sensational bank robberies in the crime history of Kerala. In the early hours of 30 December 2007, the robbers made a hole in the floor of the Kerala Gramin Bank and got away with 80 kilograms of gold and 5,000,000 rupees, a total value of 80 million Indian Rupees.

Robbery 
The bank was in the first floor of a building. The ground floor had a restaurant that was up for rent. The four-member gang rented the restaurant by giving an advance payment of about Rs. 50,000. They shut down the front door and placed a board saying that it was under renovation and would reopen on 8 January 2008. To make things more convincing, they even bought new furniture for the restaurant and much construction material for the site.

Those who were watching the scene would have thought that repairs were going on. But they were cracking the first floor open, where the strong room was kept. They made a hole in the ceiling to the strong room where they took the money from iron safes that they cut open using a gas cutting machine. They took away gold and cash kept inside the safe.

Investigations by Kerala Police 
The Kerala Police quickly formed a number of special teams. A special team led by Malappuram Superintendent of Police  P. Vijayan and Deputy Superintendent K K Ibrahim conducted the investigation under the supervision of K.S.Jangpangi the Additional Director General of Kerala Police. The team consisted of Circle Inspectors of Police Vikraman and M.P Mohanachandran, SI Anvar Hussain and other officers from the subordinate ranks . It was a challenging task for Kerala Police to begin investigation as there was no evidence and no leads available for them to proceed with. Like many other bank robberies, it was done at the wee hours of a Sunday, since it is a holiday and it had come to light only on the next day.

However, police made a computer graphic sketch image of the main culprit as illustrated by eyewitnesses and neighbors. 
The criminals tried to create an impression of Naxalite involvement in the robbery by quoting a sentence Jai Mao (praising naxalism) at the scene of the crime to deviate enquiry.
There were many attempts by the culprits to divert the whole attention of the investigation team to Hyderabad. According to police officials, the criminals had purposely left one kilogram of looted gold in a hotel room in Hyderabad and made telephone calls from many different cities of India to mislead the investigation. 

The police team also monitored all telephone calls in the closest mobile signal towers at the location of the crime during the midnight hours of the incident. It was a big task monitoring more than two million calls. The help of various mobile service providers and IT professionals was also enlisted for the probe. 

And finally, it was the identification of a secret phone number used by the main suspects to communicate between themselves, that became the turning point in the investigation.

Arrests 
The police team finally zeroed in on a house in Kozhikode where the accused were hiding and arrested four people including Joseph alias Jaison alias Babu, the kingpin of the operation along with three others including a woman and recovered 80% of the stolen gold and money. It is the first recovery in the crime history of Kerala of so much stolen property. The police further said that the remaining items would be traced within days as the accused have already confessed their location. The official arrest was formally announced on 28 February 2008 by K S Jangpangi, the additional director general of Kerala police.  

It is widely considered to be a credit to Kerala police that they solved the biggest robbery in the state within a short period and with the first recovery of so much stolen property.

Crime inspired by Dhoom 
The leader confessed that the crime was inspired by the Bollywood movie Dhoom. In the movie also, the robbers made a hole in the ground floor of the bank and got away with the valuables during the new-year event.

References 

Bank robberies
Crime in Kerala
2007 crimes in India
Robberies in India